Galahi Island (also called Head Island) is an island off the northeast coast of Sariba, in Milne Bay Province, Papua New Guinea.

Administration 
The island belongs to Sauasauaga Ward of Bwanabwana Rural Local Level Government Area LLG, Samarai-Murua District, which are in Milne Bay Province.

Geography 
The island is part of the Sariba group, itself a part of Samarai Islands of the Louisiade Archipelago.

Demographics 
The population of 20 is located on the village on the north coast.

Economy 
The islanders, are farmers as opposed to eastern Louisiade Archipelago islanders. they grow Sago, Taro, and Yams for crops.

Transportation 
The villagers have a slipway on the island.

References

Islands of Milne Bay Province
Louisiade Archipelago